Manfredi "Mampe" Rizza (born 26 April 1991) is an Italian canoeist. He finished sixth in the K-1 200 metres event at the 2016 Summer Olympics. He won a silver medal in Men's K-1 200 metres, at the 2020 Summer Olympics.

Life 
He studied mechanical engineering at the University of Pavia. Rizza took up kayaking in 2000.

References

External links
 

1991 births
Living people
Italian male canoeists
Olympic canoeists of Italy
Canoeists at the 2016 Summer Olympics
Canoeists at the 2020 Summer Olympics
Place of birth missing (living people)
Mediterranean Games silver medalists for Italy
Mediterranean Games medalists in canoeing
Competitors at the 2013 Mediterranean Games
Competitors at the 2018 Mediterranean Games
European Games competitors for Italy
Canoeists at the 2015 European Games
Canoeists at the 2019 European Games
Medalists at the 2020 Summer Olympics
Olympic silver medalists for Italy
Olympic medalists in canoeing
University of Pavia alumni